Paul Sophus Christian Henrik Rung-Keller or P. S. Rung-Keller (11 March 1879 – 22 March 1966) was a Danish organist and composer.

Biography
He was the son of lawyer  Emil Keller and operatic soprano Sophie Keller; grandson of composer Henrik Rung.
He  trained from 1907  at Hornemans Konservatorium operated by C. F. E. Horneman and at the Royal Danish Academy of Music from 1917. He was a student of organist Thomas  Laub (1852–1927). 

He was employed as organist and cantor at the Church of Our Saviour (Danish: Vor Frelsers Kirke) from 1903 to 1949. 
He was  conductor of Cecilia Association (Caeciliaforening) of Copenhagen from 1912-1934,  a post he took over after his uncle, composer Frederik Rung.

See also
 List of Danish composers

References

This article was initially translated from the Danish Wikipedia.

Danish composers
Male composers
1879 births
1966 deaths
Bellringers